Franco-Giacomo Carbone is an American production designer.

He began as a set and costume designer in New York. He has worked off Broadway for Lincoln Center Theater, La Mama and others. He graduated from the American Film Institute in 1998. Carbone's very first film, Billy's Hollywood Screen Kiss, garnered favorable reviews nationwide for its bold production design.
 His motion picture credits include Sylvester Stallone's Rocky Balboa and John Rambo, William Friedkin's Bug, Eli Roth's Hostel and Cabin Fever, David Jacobson's Down in the Valley and James Cox's Wonderland.

Filmography

References

External links

American production designers
Year of birth missing (living people)
Living people